Federal elections were held in Germany on 27 September 2009 to elect the members of the 17th Bundestag. Preliminary results showed that the Christian Democratic Union (CDU), its Bavarian sister party, the Christian Social Union (CSU), and the Free Democratic Party (FDP) won the election, and the three parties announced their intention to form a new centre-right government with Angela Merkel as chancellor. Their main opponent, Frank-Walter Steinmeier's Social Democratic Party (SPD), conceded defeat. The Christian Democrats previously governed in coalition with the FDP in most of the 1949–1966 governments of Konrad Adenauer and Ludwig Erhard and the 1982–1998 governments of Helmut Kohl.

Campaign
Since the 2005 election, Chancellor Angela Merkel (CDU) had governed in a grand coalition with the SPD. However, it was her stated goal to win a majority for CDU/CSU and FDP (the CDU/CSU's traditional coalition partner) in 2009.

Foreign minister and Vice-Chancellor Frank-Walter Steinmeier (SPD) was formally nominated as his party's chancellor-candidate at a convention on 18 October 2008. He aimed to form a government in which the SPD was the strongest party, but which also excluded the left-socialist party The Left.

The election campaign was considered exceptionally boring, which may be attributable to a perceived lack of charisma on the part of the leaders of the CDU and SPD. Another reason pointed to for the sedate campaign is that the CDU and SPD both defended the record of their grand coalition, and facing the possibility of having to continue the grand coalition in a friendly manner. Merkel was content with the low-key campaign style, which was largely seen as benefiting her party because of her high approval ratings.

CDU candidate Vera Lengsfeld released a campaign poster featuring herself and Merkel in a way that emphasised their cleavage. The poster bore the slogan "We have more to offer" (German: "").

On 23 September 2009, four days before the federal elections, German police raided the Berlin headquarters of the National Democratic Party of Germany NPD to investigate claims that letters sent from the NPD to politicians from immigrant backgrounds incited racial hatred. The NPD leader in Berlin defended the letters saying that "As part of a democracy, we're entitled to say if something doesn't suit us in this country."

In addition to the election of a new Bundestag, also scheduled for 2009 were the election to the European Parliament on 7 June, seven local elections on the same day, five state elections and an additional local election in August and September and the election of the president of Germany by the Federal Assembly on 23 May.

Opinion polls

The CDU/CSU and FDP, with an average vote share of around 50% in pre-election polling during the weeks before the election, were clearly ahead of the other traditional coalition partners in Germany, SPD and the Greens.

Results

The Christian Democratic Union (CDU), the Christian Social Union of Bavaria (CSU), and the Free Democratic Party (FDP) were able to form a centre-right government, with Angela Merkel of the CDU continuing as the chancellor and the leader of the FDP, Guido Westerwelle, becoming foreign minister and vice-chancellor.

The CDU/CSU received a slightly lower proportion than in the previous election, with the Bavarian CSU receiving its lowest vote share in decades. Overall, the CDU/CSU had their worst vote share in 60 years. In contrast, their preferred coalition partner, the liberal FDP, gained nearly 5% points to give it 14.6% of the vote, the best result of its history. The big loser of the election was the SPD, which received its worst result ever in a federal election, receiving only 23% of the total party vote and suffering the biggest percentage loss of any party in German federal election history in 60 years. The two other parties represented in the Bundestag, the Left and the Greens, both made large gains and received the highest vote share of their respective histories. For the first time, The Left won constituency seats outside its traditional stronghold of East Berlin. As a result of the losses by the SPD and the gains by the FDP, the alliance of the CDU/CSU and FDP received an outright majority of seats, ensuring that Angela Merkel would continue as chancellor.

Had the CDU/CSU and FDP failed to win a majority of seats, possible alternative coalitions may have included a continuation of the grand coalition of CDU/CSU and SPD. A traffic light coalition (SPD–FDP–Greens) was specifically ruled out by FDP leader Guido Westerwelle.

Results by state 
Second Vote ("Zweitstimme", or votes for party list)

Constituency seats

List seats

Further reading 

 Scholarly studies.
 Reher, Stefanie. "The effect of congruence in policy priorities on electoral participation." Electoral Studies 36 (2014): 158–172. based on 2009 polls; online

References

Further reading
 Hansen, Michael A., and Jonathan Olsen. "Rhapsody in Beige: The Impact of SPD Candidate Evaluations on Vote Choice in the 2009, 2013, and 2017 Federal Elections." German Politics 29.2 (2020): 223–243. online
 Schoen, Harald. "Merely a referendum on Chancellor Merkel? Parties, issues and candidates in the 2009 German federal election." German Politics 20.1 (2011): 92–106.

External links
 Official voting results from the Federal Returning Officer
 Opinion poll tracker with data
 Opinion poll tracker with graph and monthly average
 Bundestag Election Candidates
 Analysis of the election by Ingo Schmidt: The German Federal Elections: Centre-Right Wins Majority, Social Democracy Suffers Crushing Defeat, The Left Receives a Boost

Federal elections in Germany
2009 elections in Germany
Angela Merkel
Frank-Walter Steinmeier
September 2009 events in Europe